The First United Methodist Church of Louisa, Kentucky is a historic church built in c.1850.  It is located at 204 W. Main Street in Louisa.  It was added to the National Register of Historic Places in 1984.

It was deemed notable as "one of the best examples of Gothic Revival church architecture in the Big Sandy Valley of Eastern Kentucky. Built around 1850, it is today one of the oldest existing buildings in the town and one of the oldest, if not the oldest, Methodist Church in the Big Sandy Valley Area."

References

United Methodist churches in Kentucky
Churches on the National Register of Historic Places in Kentucky
Gothic Revival church buildings in Kentucky
Churches completed in 1850
19th-century Methodist church buildings in the United States
National Register of Historic Places in Lawrence County, Kentucky
1850 establishments in Kentucky
Louisa, Kentucky